Sphallonycha is a genus of longhorn beetles of the subfamily Lamiinae, containing the following species:

 Sphallonycha irundisa Galileo & Martins, 2001
 Sphallonycha roseicollis (Bates, 1866)

References

Hemilophini